The Arkprijs van het Vrije Woord (Ark Prize of the Free Word) is a symbolic award created in 1951 by Herman Teirlinck and the editorial team of the Nieuw Vlaams Tijdschrift (New Flemish magazine) to counteract ideologically driven restrictions on the freedom of expression.

Teirlinck wanted to spotlight those persons who actively promote the freedom of opinion. No financial reward is associated with the prize. The names of the laureates are engraved in an art object (the Ark) kept in the AMVC in Antwerp.

Laureates of the Arkprijs van het Vrije Woord

1951   Christine D'Haen for 'Gedichten'
1952   Hugo Claus for De Metsiers
1953   Maurice D'Haese for De Heilige Gramschap
1954   Frans Goddemaere for 'Nola'
1955   Jos De Haes for 'Gedaanten'
1956   Frans De Bruyn for 'Tekens in Steen'
1957   Albert Bontridder for Dood Hout
1958   Ivo Michiels for 'Het Afscheid'
1959   Libera Carlier for 'Action Station - Go !
1960   Ward Ruyslinck for De madonna met de buil
1961   Hugues C. Pernath for 'Het Masker Man'
1962   Georges Hebbelinck for 'De Journalist'
1963   Paul Snoek for 'Richelieu'
1964   Daniel Robberechts for 'Zesmaal'
1965   Willy Roggeman for 'Blues for Glazen Blazers'
1966   Astère M. Dhondt for 'God in Vlaanderen'
1967   Jef Geeraerts for De Troglodieten
1968   C.C. Krijgelmans for 'Homunculi'
1969   Patrick Conrad for 'Mercantile Marine Engineering'
1970   Roger van de Velde for Recht op Antwoord
1971   Eddy Van Vliet for Columbus Tevergeefs
1972   Marcel van Maele for Ik ruik mensenvlees, zei de reus
1973   Rob Goswin for 'Vanitas Vanitas'
1974   Fernand Auwera for 'Zelfportret met Gesloten Ogen'
1975   Internationale Nieuwe Scene for 'Mistero Buffo'
1976   Leonard Nolens for Twee Vormen van Zwijgen
1977   Freddy de Vree for 'Steden en Sentimenten'
1978   Roger M.J. De Neef for 'Gestorven Getal'
1979   Frans Boenders for 'Denken in Tweespraak'
1980   Lucienne Stassaert for Parfait Amour
1981   Robbe De Hert for his movies.
1982   Maurice De Wilde for 'De Nieuwe Orde'
1983   Bert Van Hoorick for In Tegenstroom
1984   Leo Pleysier for Kop in Kas
1985   Daniel Buyle for his BRT-Journalism
1986   Tone Brulin for his theatre work.
1987   De Morgen and Paul Goossens for their journalism
1988   Leo Apostel for his philosophical work
1989   Stefan Hertmans for Bezoekingen
1990   André De Beul for his political courage
1991   Frie Leysen for ten year DeSingel
1992   Paula D'Hondt for her work for immigrants
1993   Jan Blommaert and Jef Verschueren for 'Het Belgisch Migrantendebat'
1994   Gerard Alsteens (GAL) for his graphical work
1995   Tom Lanoye for 'Maten en Gewichten'
1996   Gie van den Berghe for 'Getuigen'
1997   Wannes Van de Velde for his music
1998   Pjeroo Roobjee for his art
1999   Sophie de Schaepdrijver for De Groote Oorlog
2000   ZAK for his cartoons
2001   Ludo Abicht for Intelligente Emotie
2002   Pol Hoste for 'De Lucht naar Mirabel'
2003    for his contribution to the legalisation of euthanasia
2004   Rik Pinxten for 'De Artistieke Samenleving'
2005   Christine Van Broeckhoven, molecular geneticist
2006   Marleen Temmerman for 'Onrust in de Onderbuik'
2007   Roma vzw
2008   David Van Reybrouck for 'Missie'
2009   Luc Huyse for Seismograaf van de samenleving
2010   Geert Buelens: Europa Europa
2011  Philippe Van Parijs for his sociopolitical and ethical theories
2012   Peter Holvoet-Hanssen for 'De Reis naar Inframundo'
2013   Paul De Grauwe for reconsidering traditional economic models and arguing against the perversities of raw capitalism
2014   Jeroen Olyslaegers for Winst/Occupy Antwerpen
2015   Fikry El Azzouzi for Drarrie in de nacht (roman) en Reizen Jihad (theater)
2016   Reinhilde Decleir for Tutti Fratelli 
2017   , research journalism
2018   PEN Vlaanderen, commitment to free speech
2019   Anuna De Wever and Kyra Gantois, initiators of the Flemish Youth for Climate movement.
2020   Jozef Deleu, founding editor of the reviews Ons Erfdeel and Het liegend konijn.
2021   Caroline Pauwels

See also
 Flemish literature

References

 Lukas De Vos (red.): Een Onberaamd Verbond. 50 Jaar Arkprijs van het Vrije Woord. Antwerpen, De Vrienden van de Zwarte Panter 2000, 288 blz., ill.
 Lukas De Vos (red.): "Buiten het Bereik van Farisese Handen. 60 Jaar Arkprijs van het Vrije Woord". Antwerpen, De Vrienden van de Zwarte Panter, 112 blz., ill.

Human rights awards
Belgian literary awards
Awards established in 1951
1951 establishments in Belgium
Awards by magazines